Moonlighting: the Television Soundtrack Album is the soundtrack to the ABC television series Moonlighting and was produced by Phil Ramone and Glenn Gordon Caron. It features songs performed on the show by series leads Cybill Shepherd and Bruce Willis, alongside the series theme song performed by Al Jarreau. That single peaked at number one on the Billboard Adult Contemporary chart on July 25, 1987. Other songs include Chubby Checker's "Limbo Rock", The Isley Brothers's "This Old Heart of Mine (Is Weak for You)", and "When a Man Loves a Woman" by Percy Sledge.

Track listing

Charts

References 

Television soundtracks
1987 soundtrack albums
MCA Records soundtracks